Tell Leilan is an archaeological site situated near the Wadi Jarrah in the Khabur River basin in Al-Hasakah Governorate, northeastern Syria. The site has been occupied since the 5th millennium BC. During the late third millennium, the site was known as Shekhna. During that time it was under control of the Akkadian Empire and was used as an administrative center. Around 1800 BC, the site was renamed "Shubat-Enlil" by the king Shamshi-Adad I, and it became his residential capital. Shubat-Enlil was abandoned around 1700 BC.

Geography
The site is located close to some other flourishing cities of the time. Hamoukar is about 50 km away to the southeast. Tell Brak is about 50 km away to the southwest, and also in the Khabur River basin. Tell Mozan (Urkesh) is about 50 km to the west.

Leilan, Brak and Urkesh were particularly prominent during the Akkadian period.

History
The city originated around 5000 BC as a small farming village and grew to be a large city  BC, three hundred years before the Akkadian Empire. The city had a large wall by  BC. A number of finds from the Ninevite 5 period were found at the site. A 3-foot layer of sediment at Tell Leilan containing no evidence of human habitation offered clues as to the cause of the demise of the Akkadian imperial city; analysis indicated that at around 2200 BC, a three-century drought was severe enough to affect agriculture and settlement.

Shubat-Enlil

The conquest of the region by the Amorite warlord Shamshi-Adad I (1813–1781 BC) of Assyria revived the abandoned site of Tell Leilan. Shamshi-Adad saw the great potential in the rich agricultural production of the region and made it the capital city of his empire. He renamed it from Shehna to Shubat-Enlil, or Šubat-Enlil, meaning "the residence of the god Enlil" in the Akkadian language. In the city a royal palace was built and a temple acropolis to which a straight paved street led from the city gate. There was also a planned residential area and the entire city was enclosed by a wall. Shubat-Enlil may have had a population of 20,000 people at its peak. After the death of Shamshi-Adad, the city became the capital of Apum and prospered until king Samsu-iluna of Babylon sacked it in 1726 BC. During this period various minor kings ruled there, including Turum-natki, Zuzu, and Haja-Abum. Qarni-Lim, king of nearby Andarig, maintained a large palace there.

Archaeology

Beginning in 1979 the mound of Tell Leilan was excavated by a team of archaeologists from Yale University, led by Harvey Weiss. The dig ended in 2008. Among many important discoveries at Tell Leilan is an archive of 1100 cuneiform clay tablets maintained by the rulers of the city. These tablets date to the eighteenth century BC and record the dealings with other Mesopotamian states and how the city administration worked. Finds from the excavations at Tell Leilan are on display in the Deir ez-Zor Museum.

See also

Cities of the ancient Near East
Short chronology timeline
List of Mesopotamian dynasties
Tell Khoshi

Notes

Further reading

Vincente, C.-A., "Tell Leilan Recension of the Sumerian King List.", NABU 1990, no. 11, pp. 8–9, 1990
 Weiss, Harvey, Sturt Manning, Lauren Ristvet, Lucia Mori, Mark Besonen, Andrew McCarthy, Philippe Quenet, Alexia Smith, Zainab Bahrani, "Tell Leilan Akkadian Imperialization, Collapse, and Short-Lived Reoccupation Defined by High-Resolution Radiocarbon Dating", in H. Weiss, ed., Seven Generations since the Fall of Akkad. Wiesbaden: Harrassowitz., pp. 163–192, 2012
The Climate of Man — II: The curse of Akkad. Elizabeth Kolbert. The New Yorker. May 2, 2005.
 
 
 Weiss, Harvey, Francesca deLillis, Dominique deMoulins, Jesper Eidem, Thomas Guilderson, Ulla Kasten, Torben Larsen, Lucia Mori, Lauren Ristvet, Elena Rova, and Wilma Wetterstrom, 2002, Revising the contours of history at Tell Leilan. Annales Archeologiques Arabes Syriennes, vol. 45, pp. 59–74
Weiss, Harvey, ed., 2012, Seven Generations Since the Fall of Akkad. Wiesbaden: Harrassowitz 
 Harvey Weiss, "Rediscovering: Tell Leilan on the Habur Plains of Syria", The Biblical Archaeologist, ASOR, vol. 48, no. 1, pp. 5–34 (Mar 1985)

External links
Tell Leilan project

Populated places established in the 5th millennium BC
Populated places disestablished in the 2nd millennium BC
1979 archaeological discoveries
Former populated places in Syria
18th-century BC disestablishments
Ancient Assyrian cities
Akkadian cities
Hurrian cities
Archaeological sites in al-Hasakah Governorate
Neolithic sites in Syria
Tells (archaeology)
2nd millennium BC in Assyria